Milan Berck Beelenkamp (born 17 September 1977) is a Dutch former professional footballer who played as a right back.

He has formerly played for various clubs. The most well known being Ajax and Genoa.

Club career
Berck Beelenkamp played only two matches for Ajax. After one year, he moved to FC Volendam. In 1998, he was signed by Italian Serie B club Genoa CFC. His return to the Netherlands came within a year, where he joined De Graafschap. Berck Beelenkamp played six seasons at De Vijverberg.

After his contract expired in 2005, he shortly played for Mechelen in Belgium. He left before the season was over, this time joining hometown club, HFC Haarlem.

After Haarlem's bankruptcy, he decided to turn his back to professional football, joining third division side, ARC in March 2010. He moved to Stormvogels in summer 2013 and to SV Zandvoort in 2015.

References

External links
 Milan Berck Beelenkamp at Voetbal International 

1977 births
Living people
Footballers from Haarlem
Association football defenders
Dutch footballers
AFC Ajax players
FC Volendam players
Genoa C.F.C. players
De Graafschap players
K.V. Mechelen players
HFC Haarlem players
Eredivisie players
Eerste Divisie players
Serie B players
Challenger Pro League players
Dutch expatriate footballers
Expatriate footballers in Italy
Expatriate footballers in Belgium
Dutch expatriate sportspeople in Italy
Dutch expatriate sportspeople in Belgium
SV ARC players